The Aurora Public Library is located in Aurora, Ontario, Canada. The library has a collection of more than 150,000 items and has over 31,000 registered users.

Timeline of history
1820s: A free library was organized by local Quakers.
1855: Aurora Association for the Diffusion of Helpful Knowledge formed, later called the Aurora Mechanics Institute and Library Association. The association provided weekly lectures and concerts rather than lending books.
1863: The library had a collection of 500 books and was open for two hours each Friday.
1868: The association built The Mechanics Hallis built at the southeast corner of Mosley and Victoria Streets. It was used for lectures and concerts but also as a library reading room.
1895: A Public Library Association was formed with a Board of Management appointed by the Town Council.
1920: The library assets were absorbed into a Municipal Public Library under the Free Public Libraries Act and the library moved to the Town Hall on the northeast corner of Yonge and Mosley Streets.
1926: A children's section was added to the library, but children were only allowed on Saturday afternoons.
1945: The library moved to Health Hall, now called Victoria Hall, on the southwest corner of Mosley and Victoria Streets.
1967: The collection size was 14,900 and there were 5,236 members.
1979 A  extension was finished, designed to serve a population of 20,000.
2001 The library moved to its current location, a  facility on the northeast corner of Yonge and Church Streets.

In 2018, work began on a renovation project to create a multi-purpose room and a creative studio, to update the children's area, to improve lighting, and to create a new seating and new living room-style area.

On 11 April 2020, the library laid off 28 of its 33 employees as a result of the COVID-19 pandemic.

See also
Ask Ontario
Ontario Public Libraries

References

External links

 Aurora Public Library

Public libraries in Ontario
Aurora, Ontario
Library buildings completed in 1963